Saloum Faal (born 2 November 1995 in Serekunda, The Gambia) is a professional footballer currently playing for IF Gnistan in the Finnish third tier Kakkonen.

In Finland Faal has also represented FC Jazz, Etelä-Espoon Pallo and FC Kiffen 08. He has previously played for Gambia Ports Authority and Casa Sports.

Faal has capped four times for the Gambia national football team.

References

External links

Living people
1995 births
Gambian footballers
The Gambia international footballers
Gambian expatriate footballers
Expatriate footballers in Senegal
Expatriate footballers in Finland
FC Jazz players
Etelä-Espoon Pallo players
FC Kiffen 08 players
IF Gnistan players
Kakkonen players
Gambia Ports Authority FC players
Association football midfielders